Archibald Johnson may refer to:

Archibald Thomas Johnson, birth name of Dick Sutherland (1881–1934), American film actor
Arch Johnson (1922–1997), American stage and television actor
Archie Johnson, fictional character

See also
Archibald Johnston (disambiguation)